Lyudmila Vyacheslavovna Koblova (born 26 May 1967) is a Russian former pair skater who competed for the Soviet Union. With her skating partner, Andrei Kalitin, she won seven international medals, including gold at the 1985 Nebelhorn Trophy and bronze at the 1986 Skate America.

After retiring from competition, Koblova became a skating coach in Russia. She formerly coached Viktoria Borzenkova, Andrei Chuvilaev, Kristina Astakhova, and Nikita Bochkov.

Competitive highlights 
With Kalitin

References 

1967 births
Russian female pair skaters
Soviet female pair skaters
Living people
Sportspeople from Nizhny Novgorod